The Nihoa conehead katydid (Banza nihoa) is a species of katydid which is endemic to the Hawaiian island of Nihoa (Northwestern Hawaiian Islands). It is one of the ten species in the genus Banza, all of them native to Hawaii, although it is the sister species to the remaining nine, and may belong in a separate genus. It gets its food mostly from plant leaves, but because of the low population, it does not do significant damage. Unlike Main Islands' species, whose males leap on the females before mating, the Nihoa variants sing to them. It is listed as a vulnerable species on the IUCN Red List, and as a "species of concern" under the Endangered Species Act.

References

Further reading
N. Evenhuis and L. Eldredge, Natural History of Nihoa and Necker Islands, Bishop Museum Press, Honolulu, 2004.

Tettigoniidae
Endemic fauna of Nihoa
Insects of Hawaii
Endangered fauna of Hawaii
Vulnerable fauna of Oceania
Insects described in 1926